The King David Schools are a network of Jewish day schools in Johannesburg, South Africa, offering nursery through high school education. There are three campuses across Johannesburg: Linksfield, Victory Park, and Sandton; "each school has an atmosphere of its own serving the specific community". The schools are under the auspices of the South African Board of Jewish Education.

King David aims to deliver "an excellent general education together with the study of Hebrew, Jewish Studies and the living of the Jewish calendar and year cycle" and to produce "graduates who are menschen, confident and equipped to pursue any opportunity they wish to, who are proud of their Jewish heritage and its traditions, who have a love for learning, and a determination to contribute to their society."

The Linksfield campus, in northeastern Johannesburg, was established in 1948 as South Africa's first Jewish day school (the high school was founded in 1955); see further under History of the Jews in South Africa. Many of the original buildings of the high school from 1948 still exist on the campus. As a relatively large school, King David Linksfield fields strong teams in several sports. The Victory Park campus (primary school, 1960; high school, 1964) serves northern and northwestern Johannesburg. It has fewer students than Linksfield. The Sandton campus, a primary school, is the most recently established (1982), and feeds into both high schools. Each campus also has its own nursery school.

The schools write the Independent Examination Board examinations for Matriculation; pass rates are very high, and pupils are often amongst the top-ranked, nationwide. The King Davids also achieve in various cultural activities, and, particularly Linksfield, in sporting activities. Each school is involved in several outreach and charity programs, focused on the Jewish and broader communities, including (matriculation) support and enrichment programs for Schools in Alexandra and Soweto. Many King David alumni are noted for their achievements, in South Africa and internationally – see Links below.

Although only a small minority of the pupils are observant – Johannesburg has several Religious day schools – the schools are (nominally) Orthodox. Practically, no school activities take place on Shabbat or on Jewish Holidays, all catering is Kosher, and the school day begins with Shacharit (Morning prayers). Educationally, each school has a Rabbi on staff, Hebrew and/or Jewish Studies are compulsory subjects until Grade 11 (Form IV), and the schools offer a "Beit Midrash stream" – established by Chief Rabbi, Dr. Warren Goldstein – for Grade 10s and 11s who choose this over the regular Jewish Studies classes. The schools are also served by "the DIJE" (Division of Informal Jewish Education), offering programmes which "complement the formal classroom and allow learners to engage with and experience their Judaism".  "Encounter", for Grade 11s, is the DIJE's premier educational programme – it aims to "create a domain of conversation in which the participants are able to question, learn about and understand the relevance of Judaism in today's modern world."

An interesting fact is that the two high schools were headed by identical twin brothers, Elliot and Jeffrey Wolf, from the early 1970s through the 1990s; their involvement with the King Davids has continued since retirement, and they have devoted a combined 75 years to the schools.

The King David Schools' Foundation (KDSF) is active in fundraising, with a dual focus on outreach and subsidies/scholarships. Relatedly, it also acts as an alumni association through monthly e-newsletters, reunions and other fundraising events. KDSF was founded in 1994 under the auspices of the SABJE, as a registered non-profit organisation.

Notable alumni

Linksfield
 Danny K (full name Daniel Koppel), singer, songwriter and actor
 Shaun Rubenstein,  canoer and Olympian
 Adrian Gore, businessman and entrepreneur, founder and group chief executive of Discovery Limited
 Dan Stein, Professor and Chair of the Dept of Psychiatry and Mental Health at the University of Cape Town
 Gail Louw, playwright
 Larry Cohen, professional footballer
 Jonathan Kaplan, international rugby union referee

Victory Park
Akiva Tatz, Orthodox rabbi, inspirational speaker and writer
 Lance Metz, mountain climbers
 Max Price, former vice-chancellor and principal of the University of Cape Town
Andrew Kuper, founder and CEO of LeapFrog Investments
Debbie Berman, film and television editor,  best known for her work on the Marvel Cinematic Universe.

See also
Jewish education in South Africa
Jewish day school
 Johannesburg based Jewish day schools:
Torah Academy School, Johannesburg
Yeshiva College of South Africa

References

External links
Listing of all component schools
King David Linksfield: 1, 2
King David Victory Park: 1, 2
King David Sandton: 1, 2
King David Schools' Foundation, kdsf.org
"Dynamic Davidians" @ kdsf.org

Jewish day schools
Jewish schools in South Africa
Schools in Johannesburg
Jews and Judaism in Johannesburg
Educational institutions established in 1948
Orthodox Judaism in South Africa
1948 establishments in South Africa